Henry William Honiball (born 1 December 1965) is a South African former professional rugby union footballer. He usually played at fly-half and sometimes as a centre.

Honiball played for  early in his career, but is best known for his time with Natal and the Sharks. Towards the end of his career he had a spell with English club Bristol. He won 35 caps for South Africa from 1993 to 1999, during the early post-apartheid era.

Biography
Honiball had a very expansive running game which brought the loose-forwards into the game quickly. He was also very tall for a fly-half and extremely physical, being a strong tackler and not afraid to take the ball and challenge the opposition. He earned his nickname of 'Lem', which is Afrikaans for 'blade', for his ability to 'cut' through his opponent's defence. Paired in the halves with Joost van der Westhuizen, Honiball was an integral part of Nick Mallett's legendary Springbok squad which equalled the record of 17 consecutive Test victories, a record shared with New Zealand. Honiball played in 14 of the 17 victories, which included the clean sweep of the 1998 Tri Nations Series, the Springboks' first-ever series victory. Such was his reading, distribution and tactical knowledge of the game that he had an enviable Springbok success rate of nearly 75 per cent.

He made his debut in 1993 against the Wallabies in Sydney, coming on as a replacement. Although South Africa lost the match 19–12, Honiball was also a member of the South African team that mauled Australia 61–22 during the 1997 Tri Nations tournament, (which was only replaced on 30 August 2008 with a 53–8 win to South Africa in Johannesburg during the 2008 Tri Nations Series) as Australia's heaviest ever defeat. However, in the aftermath of the record-equalling streak, Honiball was understood to have been affected by the sensational axing of captain and close friend Gary Teichmann. After the Springboks struggled to find their rhythm in the following year's Tri Nations tournament, Mallett had considered recalling Honiball for the match against New Zealand in Pretoria. He had only just returned from serious injury and was playing well for club side Natal, but revealed that he had suffered an ankle injury, so Mallett sent him to see a specialist in Johannesburg. Honiball retired from international rugby after the Springboks beat New Zealand in the 1999 Rugby World Cup third/fourth place play-off.

After the World Cup, he played one season for Bristol, amassing 283 points before a serious neck injury forced him to retire.

Test history

See also
List of South Africa national rugby union players – Springbok no. 590

References

External links

1965 births
Living people
South African rugby union players
South Africa international rugby union players
South African people of British descent
Afrikaner people
Bristol Bears players
Sharks (Currie Cup) players
Sharks (rugby union) players
South Africa international rugby sevens players
Male rugby sevens players
Rugby union fly-halves
Rugby union centres